Zdynia  (Zhdynia) is a village in the administrative district of Gmina Uście Gorlickie, within Gorlice County, Lesser Poland Voivodeship, in southern Poland, close to the border with Slovakia.

The village has a population of 220. Zdynia is the site of an annual festival of Lemko culture. The village is located between mountains of Beskid Niski on the way of walking and cycle paths. It is also a place of one of the largest in Poland motorcycle gatherings.

References

Lemko Region
Rusyn culture
Villages in Gorlice County
Kingdom of Galicia and Lodomeria
Kraków Voivodeship (1919–1939)